Hunny (stylized as HUNNY) is an American rock band from Newbury Park, California, formed in 2014. The band consists of Jason Yarger, Jake Goldstein, Kevin Grimmett, and Joey Anderson.

History
Lead singer and guitarist Jason Yarger and bassist Gregory Horne had been friends since high school. After all the members had been in multiple bands around the local area (notably with other members of Bad Suns and The Neighbourhood), they decided to join forces and form Hunny in 2014. They released their first single "Honey Blonde". Their second single, "Cry For Me", was released in January 2015 and became a breakthrough hit, gaining over 1 million streams within a year. On 9 October 2015, they released their debut EP, Pain / Ache / Loving. In 2016, Hunny released the singles "Vowels (and The Importance of Being Me)"  and "Colder Parts". Guitarist Jake Munk left the band in December 2016. In May 2017, Hunny released their second EP Windows I. 
In early 2018, bassist Gregory Horne left the band. Hunny signed to Epitaph Records in July 2018, before releasing their third EP Windows II. In May 2019, Hunny released their first full-length album, Yes. Yes. Yes. Yes. Yes. Hunny worked with producer Carlos de la Garza on the album.

Band members
Current members
 Jason Yarger - lead vocalist, guitarist (2014–present)
 Kevin Grimmett - backup vocalist, keyboardist (2014–present)  bassist (2018–present)
 Jake Goldstein - guitarist (2014–present)
 Joey Anderson - drummer (2014–present)
Former members
 Jake Munk - guitarist (2014-2016) 
 Gregory Horne - bassist (2014-2018)

Discography
Singles
Honey Blonde (2014)
Vowels (and the Importance of Being Me) (2016)
Colder Parts (2016)
Sports with Strangers (2021)
Xbox Luvr (2021)
Daydreams / Heartbreaks (2021)
EPs
Pain / Ache / Loving (2015)
Windows I (2017)
Windows II (2018)

Albums
Yes. Yes. Yes. Yes. Yes. (2019)
Homesick (2022)

References

Musical groups from California
Musical groups established in 2014
2014 establishments in California